Charles Albert Eric Goodhart,  (born 23 October 1936) is a British economist. His career can be divided into two sections: his term with the Bank of England and its associated public policy; and his academic work with the London School of Economics. Charles Goodhart's work focuses on central bank governance practices and monetary frameworks. He also conducted academic research into foreign exchange markets. He is best known as the founder of Goodhart's Law, which states: "When a measure becomes a target, it ceases to be a good measure."

Early life and education 
Charles Goodhart was born on 23 October 1936 to an American Jew, Arthur Lehman Goodhart, and his English wife, Cecily Carter, in Oxford, England.  Arthur Lehman Goodhart studied law at Trinity College, Cambridge, eventually becoming a law don at Corpus Christi College. Following the family's move to Oxford, Charles' father became the Professor of Jurisprudence in 1936 and the Master of University College (1951–1963). Cecily Carter brought her three sons (Phillip Goodhart, William Goodhart and Charles Goodhart) up as members of the Church of England. During WWII, Arthur Goodhart's outspoken opposition to Nazism led to Charles (aged 2) being evacuated alongside his two elder brothers to the United States. Upon their return, Charles joined his brother William Goodhart at the St Leonards branch of the (Oxford) Summerfields School. Charles was then accepted to Eton College where he focused on the study of history and languages. After he finished school, he completed two years of compulsory national military service (1955–1956) in which he was involved with the Hungarian Revolution of 1956 and the Suez Crisis and earned the title of Second lieutenant in the King's Royal Rifle Corps.

Cambridge (1957–1965) 
In October of 1957, Goodhart started studying economics at Cambridge University. In his first year, he came in first in his course. He learnt under economists such as Nicky Kaldor, Richard Kahn, Joan Robinson, Michael Farrell, Frank Hahn and Robin Matthews. In his final year of study, he was paired in tutorials with Sir James Mirrless. He completed his undergraduate course with First Class Honours. After completing his undergraduate degree at Cambridge, Charles moved to the United States in 1960 to begin research at Harvard University studying trade cycles. In June 1962, following the completion of his PhD thesis, which analysed United States monetary history (specifically why the economy rebounded in 1907 but not in 1929), Charles and his new wife travelled back to Cambridge. Charles took up a Prize Fellowship at Trinity College and became an assistant lecturer in economics (1963–1964). He spent the next two years interpreting English monetary history by cumulating and analysing the monthly reports of the London Joint Stock Banks, which were published after the Barings crisis of 1890.

London School of Economics (1966–1968) 
In 1964, Goodhart briefly joined the Department of Economic Affairs. During this time, he worked on White Papers, planning the growth of the energy, construction and housing sectors in England. Goodhart left the Department of Economic Affairs in 1966 when he joined the London School of Economics as a lecturer on monetary policy. During this time, he contributed to a study on English monetary policy Monetary Policy in Twelve Industrial Countries  which was commissioned by the federal Reserve Bank of Boston. He also co-authored an article in the field of political economy alongside R.J. Bhansali, which featured in the journal 'Political Studies'. He stayed at the London School of Economics until 1968.

Career

Bank of England (1968–1985) 
Charles left the London School of Economics to work a temporary two-year assignment at the Bank of England.  He found his expertise in monetary economics and his knowledge of Milton Friedman's ideas to be of high value.  He was allocated to the Economic Intelligence Department which was responsible for calculating and simulating economic statistics as well as writing the Bank of England's Quarterly Bulletin. His first job at the Bank of England was to explain the concept of domestic credit expansion to individuals within the Bank, whilst conveying the Bank's viewpoints on such issues to outside economists. In 1970, he was tasked with empirically assessing the predictability of the demand for money, and had the results published in the Bank of England's Quarterly Bulletin in a paper called 'The Importance of Money'. During this time Goodhart served as the first secretary of the Monetary Review Committee, who provided summarised views of monetary developments to the Chancellor and Treasury of England.

Whilst attending a conference held by the Reserve Bank of Australia in 1975, Goodhart wrote in his footnotes "whenever a government seeks to rely on a previously observed statistical regularity for control purposes, that regularity will collapse". This quote became known as Goodhart's Law. Goodhart's Law is commonly expressed as: "When a measure becomes a target, it ceases to be a good measure". In 1979, Goodhart jointly wrote a paper which was published in the Bank of England's Quarterly Bulletin. This paper advised the new Thatcher government against implementing monetary base control. In the early 1980's, Goodhart joined the home finance division of the Bank of England, under John Fford. In 1980 he was promoted to Senior Adviser at the Bank of England and stayed at this role until 1985. Following the events of Black Saturday (1983), Goodhart travelled to Hong Kong to assist in implementing a currency board system that was linked to the United States dollar. This system helped solve the Hong Kong monetary crisis. Goodhart served on the Hong Kong Exchange Fund Advisory Council (an advisory board for the Hong Kong Monetary Authority) for more than a decade (1983–1997).

London School of Economics (1986–2002) 
Following Goodhart's departure from the Bank of England, he re-joined the London School of Economics as the Norman Sosnow Professor of Banking and Finance. He co-founded the Financial Markets Group alongside Prof. Mervyn King, in 1986. In late 1987, he gave his first lecture; 'The foreign exchange market: a random walk with a dragging anchor', which was reprinted later in Economica. During this period (1988 – 1995) his work focused on foreign exchange markets, specifically analysing the efficient-market hypothesis. To help with this research, Goodhart (with the help of Reuters) built his own data series. He then collaborated with Swiss firm Olsen and Associates to lead conferences about the importance of high speed data analysis and collection. His results from his work were published in his book: 'The Foreign Exchange Market: Empirical Studies With High-Frequency Data'.

Goodhart helped advise and publicly supported the Reserve Bank of New Zealand Act (RBNZ) 1989, which permitted the Reserve Bank of New Zealand to vary interest rates to help meet agreed inflation targets. In 1990, Goodhart was elected as a Fellow of the British Academy. In 1997 he was awarded the CBE for services to monetary economics. From late 1997 until May 2000, he was a member of the Bank of England Monetary Policy Committee. 

He retired from the London School of Economics in 2002 at which point he was appointed the Emeritus Professor of Banking and Finance. Following his retirement, Goodhart continued to write academic articles and books. He assisted in the English Parliament's review of approaches to monetary policy in 2007. Four years prior to the Global Financial Crisis, Goodhart identified how the global economy was financially unstable in his Per Jacobsson lecture 'Some New Directions for Financial Stability?'. In the years following the Global Financial Crisis, much of his work has focused on fixing regulation to provide financial stability for the economy, specifically providing reforms that "diminish the extent and volatility of the credit and leverage cycles". In an article included as part of the South African Reserve Bank Conference, Goodhart assessed the actions taken to provide global financial stability and concluded: "proposed reforms are incomplete and/or partially misdirected". In 2015, Goodhart critiqued the Warsh Review of the Bank of England's policy on monetary process. 

He was also an economic consultant at Morgan Stanley from 2009 until 2016, when he retired at the age of 80. At the 2021 Central Banking Awards, Goodhart was awarded the Central Banking Lifetime Achievement Award for his work on monetary frameworks, risk management and foreign exchange markets as well as his involvement in the Hong Kong peg, the independence of the Royal Bank of New Zealand and the creation of Goodhart's Law.

Influence

Goodhart's Law 
One of Charles Goodhart's most prominent contributions to monetary economics is known as Goodhart's Law. Charles wrote this law in the footnotes of his paper Problems of monetary management: the UK experience for the Reserve Bank of Australia during his time at the Bank of England (1975). The law states that: "whenever a government seeks to rely on a previously observed statistical regularity for control purposes, that regularity will collapse". Although written initially as a witty comment about monetary targeting, the underlying thought behind this notion was taken very seriously and was linked to the Lucas Critique of evaluation and policy modelling.This law was generalised by anthropologist Marilyn Strathern beyond the world of statistics. The most commonly used version of Goodhart's Law comes from Strathern's paper: "When a measure becomes a target, it ceases to be a good measure". In reflection to the creation of Goodhart's Law, Charles wrote: "it does feel slightly odd to have one's public reputation largely based on a minor footnote".

Research 
Goodhart pioneered the integration of macroeconomics and finance, bringing them together in the monetary and regulatory policies of central banks. He advocates for policies that are supported by a strong theoretical base and backed up by empirical evidence and data. To provide this empirical evidence, Goodhart used economic models that can be expressed in the mathematic form. He found value in mathematical models as they can be integrated with real world data – exposing their usefulness and any underlying interactions.

He is quoted saying: "It is only by constructing a mathematical institutional economics that one can study the economic system in a rigorous and analytical manner".

Throughout his career, Goodhart played a role in improving the practice of financial regulation and central banking by making it easier for governments and central bankers to benefit public welfare by dampening economic cycles.

Selected works
Google Scholar listed Charles Goodhart being the author or co-author of 539 articles and books by the end of 2017. His most cited works include Money, Information and Uncertainty and The Evolution of Central Banks.

References

External links 
 
 

1936 births
Living people
Academics of the London School of Economics
Alumni of Trinity College, Cambridge
Harvard Graduate School of Arts and Sciences alumni
British economists
British Jews
Commanders of the Order of the British Empire
Jewish scientists
Fellows of the British Academy
Lehman family
Honorary Fellows of the London School of Economics
Institute for New Economic Thinking